Knott's Soak City is a seasonal water park owned and operated by Cedar Fair located in Buena Park, California. The Knott's Soak City name was previously used for two other water parks in Southern California, since sold to SeaWorld Parks & Entertainment and CNL Lifestyle Properties.

Attractions
The chain's first water park opened in Buena Park under the name Soak City U.S.A. on June 17, 2000. It is located east of Knott's Berry Farm and occupies  near the Knott's main parking lot and Independence Hall replica.

Former Attractions

Former Knott's Soak City locations

San Diego

The chain's third water park was located in Chula Vista. It opened in 1997 under the name White Water Canyon. On November 20, 2012, Cedar Fair announced it had sold its San Diego Soak City park to SeaWorld Parks & Entertainment. The park reopened as Aquatica San Diego on June 1, 2013.

In Late-2019, it was announced that the park would be re-themed as Sesame Place San Diego for the 2021 season. On September 12, 2021, Aquatica San Diego closed for its final season, with Sesame Place San Diego opening in March 2022.

Palm Springs

The chain's second water park was located in Palm Springs. It opened in 1986 under the name Oasis Water Park; it was purchased by Cedar Fair and operated under the Knott's name from 2002 to 2013. On August 14, 2013, Cedar Fair announced it had sold its Palm Springs Soak City to CNL Lifestyle Properties. The park was allowed to operate under the Soak City name for the until the end of the 2013 season. CNL Lifestyle Properties operated the park as Wet'n'Wild Palm Springs until 2018, when it was sold again to Pono Acquisition Partners I, LLC. The park was closed and demolition began in 2019 for transformation into the Palm Springs Surf Club, which was forecasted to open in 2020, but the COVID-19 pandemic pushed it to 2022.

See also
 Soak City (disambiguation)

References

External links
 

Water parks in California
Cedar Fair water parks
Knott's Berry Farm
Buildings and structures in Orange County, California
1999 establishments in California
Tourist attractions in Orange County, California
Buena Park, California